Christophe Héral (born November 24, 1960)  is a French film and video game composer. He has composed music for Ubisoft video games such as Beyond Good & Evil, The Adventures of Tintin: The Secret of the Unicorn, Rayman Origins, Rayman Legends, and Beyond Good and Evil 2.

References

External links

1960 births
French film score composers
Living people
French male film score composers
Video game composers